Ellis William Birchall was an English footballer who played as a left-back for Port Vale.

Career
Birchall joined Port Vale as an amateur in September 1944, and signed as a professional in April 1945. He made his debut at left-back in a 3–0 win over Notts County in a Football League, Third Division (South) North Region match on 29 December 1945. He made one further appearance in the competition, and featured once in the FA Cup, before he was given a free transfer in April 1947.

Career statistics
Source:

References

English footballers
Association football fullbacks
Port Vale F.C. players